Salt Lake City is the capital of the U.S. state of Utah, and the county seat of Salt Lake County.

Salt Lake City may refer to:

 Downtown Salt Lake City, a district of Salt Lake City
 Salt Lake City metropolitan area, the city and its suburbs
 Bidhannagar, Kolkata, a neighborhood popularly known as Salt Lake City
 
In music:
 "Salt Lake City" (song), a 1965 song by The Beach Boys from their album Summer Days (And Summer Nights!!)

In transport:
 Salt Lake City Intermodal Hub, a multi-modal transportation hub in Salt Lake City
 Salt Lake City International Airport, an airport in western Salt Lake City
 , the name of two ships of the United States Navy
 USS Salt Lake City (CA-25), a Pensacola-class cruiser, later reclassified as a heavy cruiser  (launched in 1927 and decommissioned in 1946)
 USS Salt Lake City (SSN-716), a Los Angeles-class submarine (launched in 1982 and decommissioned in 2006)